Erysiphe heraclei is a plant pathogen that causes powdery mildew on several species including dill, carrot and parsley.

Importance
Erysiphe heraclei is no different than your typical powdery mildew as it shares many of the important traits that make it a plant disease worth paying attention too. In the case of powdery mildew of carrots yield loss is a very typical result of an infection, as well as the reduction of the ability to mechanically pull carrots from the ground during harvest due to leaf damage (McGrath 2013). The effects of yield lost are felt most with early infections, for carrots there has been a noted difference in disease expression and harshness across growing operations. In some experimental trials carrots who had no control measures against Erysiphe heraclei experience yield losses of 20%. Powdery mildew of carrots can also infect other plants as well. It has shown to infect certain celery, parsley, dill, chervil and parsnip strains as well (OSU, 2008).

Disease cycle
Erysiphe heraclei causes powdery mildew of carrots. It closely follows the standard life cycle of powdery mildews. Erysiphe heraclei is considered an obligate biotroph, which means it needs a living host to survive and feeds on living plant tissue. This characteristic is an important part for why the powdery mildew life cycle is what it is. The first stage in the disease cycle starts in the spring where the overwintering inoculum become exposed to ideal conditions. The inoculum overwinter in fungal fruiting bodies called cleistothecia (OSU, 2008). The cleistothecia then releases airborne spores called ascospores into the environment, which will serve as the primary inoculum during the growing season. The ascospores are then dispersed by the wind, or water where they then germinate on any leaf tissue they can find. It enters the plant by the use of a germ tube, giving the spore access to the inside of the plant. Once on the host plant another type of spore called, conidia are produced (McGrath, Cornell). The conidia then serve as the “secondary inoculum” for the disease and infect the plant further or other nearby plants for the rest of the growing season. Due to having this “secondary inoculum” this makes powdery mildew of carrots a polycyclic disease since it is able to infect further on in the growing season past the primary inoculum. The surviving conidia then overwinter and serve as primary inoculum in the spring to start the cycle all over again.

Management
Multiple management strategies are used for the control of Erysiphe heraclei. Chemical controls are the most popular method of control and include a variety of fungicides. Common fungicides used by growers include Bravo, which provides contact control of the disease. While other fungicides provide mobile control such as Quilt, Endura, Tilt, and others (McGrath, 2013). The most important aspect when it comes to applying fungicides is timing. In order for the fungicides to be as effective as possible they should be applied very early in the season and when conditions for Erysiphe heraclei are ideal (high temp, high moisture).  Another key tip to remember when using fungicides is proper rotation of fungicides in order to prevent disease resistance (Australian plant pathology society, 2011). Aside from chemical control, mulching can also be used to minimize drought stress the plant may get during the growing season, by reducing the stress on the plant it makes it less susceptible to diseases overall.

References

1. "Erysiphe Heraclei -- Discover Life". Discoverlife.Org, 2018, https://www.discoverlife.org/20/q?search=Erysiphe+heraclei. Accessed 10 Dec 2018.

2. "APS Journals". Apsjournals.Apsnet.Org, 2018, https://apsjournals.apsnet.org/doi/10.1094/PDIS-94-4-0483B. Accessed 10 Dec 2018.

3. Dpi.Nsw.Gov.Au, 2018, https://www.dpi.nsw.gov.au/__data/assets/pdf_file/0004/184423/Powdery-mildew-a-new-disease-of-carrots.pdf. Accessed 10 Dec 2018.|from=Q5396389}}

4. "Erysiphe Heraclei – Plant Parasites Of Europe", bladmineerders.Nl, 2018, https://bladmineerders.nl/parasites/fungi/ascomycota/pezizomycotina/leotiomycetes/erysiphales/erysiphaceae/erysiphe/erysiphe-heraclei/. Accessed 10 Dec 2018.

5. "Powdery Mildew Of Carrot (Erysiphe Heraclei)", plantwise.org, 2018, https://www.plantwise.org/KnowledgeBank/Datasheet.aspx?dsid=22077. Accessed 10 Dec 2018.

6. "Powdery Mildew Of Grape", ohioline.osu.edu, 2018, https://ohioline.osu.edu/factsheet/plpath-fru-37. Accessed 10 Dec 2018.

7. "Vegetable Diseases Cornell", vegetablemdonline.ppath.cornell.edu, 2018, http://vegetablemdonline.ppath.cornell.edu/NewsArticles/Carrot_Powdery.html. Accessed 10 Dec 2018.

Fungal plant pathogens and diseases
Vegetable diseases
heraclei
Fungi described in 1815